Delias themis is a butterfly in the family Pieridae. It was described by William Chapman Hewitson in 1861. It is found in the Indomalayan realm.

Subspecies
D. t. themis (Mindanao, Panaon, Letye, Camiguin & Bohol Islands)
D. t. soteira Fruhstorfer, 1910 (Luzon, Marinduque & Polillo Islands)
D. t. mihoae Nakano, 1993 (Negros)
D. t. yuii Nakano, 1993 (Panay)
D. t. kawamurai Nakano, 1993 (Mindoro)

References

External links
Delias at Markku Savela's Lepidoptera and Some Other Life Forms

themis
Butterflies described in 1861
Butterflies of Asia
Taxa named by William Chapman Hewitson